Arthur Watt (12 December 1891 – 8 October 1973) was an Australian cricketer. He played seven first-class matches for Tasmania between 1911 and 1926.

See also
 List of Tasmanian representative cricketers

References

External links
 

1891 births
1973 deaths
Australian cricketers
Tasmania cricketers
Cricketers from Hobart